Silver leaf or Silverleaf may refer to:

Animals 
 Bemisia tabaci, the silverleaf whitefly
 Trachypithecus cristatus, the silvered leaf monkey

Places

Australia 
 Silverleaf, Queensland, a locality in South Burnett Region, Queensland

United States 
 Silverleaf, North Dakota, United States
 Silver Leaf Township, Becker County, Minnesota, United States

Plants

Common name "Silverleaf" 
 Argophyllum nullumense, Australian shrub
 Callicoma serratifolia, Australian tree, also known as the black wattle
 Leucadendron argenteum, South African tree
 Leucophyllum frutescens, North American shrub, also known as the Texas sage
 Terminalia sericea, South African tree
 A fictional herb in the game Warcraft

Common name containing "Silverleaf" 
 Acer saccharinum, the silverleaf maple
 Ambrosia tomentosa, the silverleaf povertyweed
 Arctostaphylos silvicola, the silverleaf manzanita
 Astragalus falcatus, the silverleaf milkvetch
 Cercocarpus montanus, the silverleaf mountain mahogany
 Cotoneaster pannosus, the silverleaf cotoneaster
 Dichondra sericea, the silverleaf ponysfoot
 Englerophytum natalense, the silver-leaf milkplum
 Hydrangea radiata, the silverleaf hydrangea
 Pediomelum argophyllum, the silverleaf Indian breadroot
 Phacelia hastata, the silverleaf scorpionweed
 Pleurophyllum hookeri, the silverleaf daisy
 Populus alba, the silverleaf poplar
 Quercus hypoleucoides, the silverleaf oak
 Solanum elaeagnifolium, the silverleaf maple

Diseases 
 Silver leaf (disease) (caused by Chondrostereum purpureum), a fungal disease of trees, including:
 Silver leaf of almond

Other 
 Silver leaf (art), elemental silver leaf used to decorate objects
 Silver leaf (food), elemental silver leaf used to decorate food
 Silverleaf, pen name of Jessie Lloyd, Australian writer
 USS Silverleaf (AN-68), an Ailanthus-class net laying ship

Animal common name disambiguation pages